Mark Henry Durkan (born 3 March 1978) is a Social Democratic and Labour Party (SDLP) politician in Northern Ireland who was elected to the Northern Ireland Assembly in 2011, representing the Foyle constituency. He served as Minister of the Environment until the department was dissolved in 2016. He is currently the SDLP spokesperson for Social Justice.

Early life
Mark Durkan was born March 3, 1978, to Patrick and Gay Durkan. He was one of six siblings. He studied in St Columb's College, Derry, before studying English at Queen's University, Belfast. After leaving university, he worked for Ulster Ceramics, and then as a shop assistant, until his election to Derry City Council in 2005.

Work
Durkan was elected to Derry City Council in 2005 topping the poll with 2369 first preference votes. He served on council until May 2011 sitting on the Western Health & Social Care Board and Western Education and Library Board. After his election to the Assembly in May 2011 he served as his party's health spokesman from May 2011 to April 2012, and campaigned on the outbreak in January 2012 of pseudomonas at both Royal Jubilee Maternity Services (Belfast) and Altnagelvin Area Hospital (Derry), which claimed the lives of several infants.

It was on the NI Assembly's Social Development Committee from May 2011 to July 2013 where he really came to the fore working tirelessly and effectively on issues such as housing and to protect the most vulnerable in society from the negative impacts the Welfare Reform Bill.
As Environment Minister Mark H. Durkan has proposed reforms to the NI Planning system in order to make it fairer, faster and more fit for purpose. He is also considering an outright ban on election posters.

Personal life
In 2006, Durkan sustained life-threatening injuries following a fall at his parents' home.

In his spare time, he regularly gives his time to charitable causes, which led him to compete in Ballroom and Latin Dancing competitions in his hometown, and white-collar boxing bouts. He is a running enthusiast having completed several half marathons and the first ever Walled City Marathon in Derry on 2 June 2013.

Durkan married Anne Carlin on 13 July 2013, and has three sons and a daughter. The family live in Strathfoyle. He is a nephew of former SDLP leader Mark Durkan.

References

1978 births
Living people
Social Democratic and Labour Party MLAs
People educated at St Columb's College
Alumni of Queen's University Belfast
Politicians from Derry (city)
Northern Ireland MLAs 2011–2016
Northern Ireland MLAs 2016–2017
Northern Ireland MLAs 2017–2022
Northern Ireland MLAs 2022–2027